The  is Japanese aerial lift line in Chihayaakasaka, Ōsaka. The line is unique as it is owned by the village government. Opened in 1966, the line climbs Mount Kongō, the highest point of Ōsaka.

As of November 1, 2019, operation is suspended at Mt. Kongo Ropeway.

Basic data
Distance: 
Vertical interval:

See also
List of aerial lifts in Japan

References

External links
 Official website
 Chihaya Akasaka Tourism Association

Aerial tramways in Japan
1966 establishments in Japan